The 2022 Women's Indoor Hockey World Cup would have been the sixth edition of this tournament and scheduled to be played from 3 to 7 February 2021 in Liège, Belgium. It was originally scheduled for February 2021, but was postponed due to the COVID-19 pandemic.

The tournament was cancelled on 10 January 2022, due to the COVID-19 pandemic.

Qualification
Twelve teams qualified to participate in the tournament. Australia and New Zealand withdrew from the tournament due to the travel restrictions related to the COVID-19 pandemic and were replaced by Canada and South Africa.

See also
2022 Men's FIH Indoor Hockey World Cup
2022 Women's FIH Hockey World Cup

References

External links
FIH website

Indoor Hockey World Cup
Women's Indoor Hockey World Cup
Indoor Hockey World Cup, 2022 Women's
FIH Indoor Hockey World Cup